The October Draconids, in the past also unofficially known as the Giacobinids, are a meteor shower whose parent body is the periodic comet 21P/Giacobini-Zinner. They are named after the constellation Draco, where they seemingly come from. Almost all meteors which fall towards Earth ablate long before reaching its surface. The Draconids are best viewed after sunset in an area with a clear dark sky.

The 1933 and 1946 Draconids had Zenithal Hourly Rates of thousands of meteors visible per hour, among the most impressive meteor storms of the 20th century. Rare outbursts in activity can occur when the Earth travels through a denser part of the cometary debris stream; for example, in 1998, rates suddenly spiked and spiked again (less spectacularly) in 2005. A Draconid meteor outburst occurred as expected on October 8, 2011, though a waxing gibbous Moon reduced the number of meteors observed visually.  During the 2012 shower radar observations detected up to 1000 meteors per hour. The 2012 outburst may have been caused by the narrow trail of dust and debris left behind by the parent comet in 1959.

References

 Michael D. Reynolds. Falling Stars. Stackpole Books, 2001. p. 42.
 Jun-Ichi Watanabe and Mikiya Sato. "Activities of Parent Comets and Related Meteor Showers". Earth, Moon, and Planets, Vol 102, No 1-4 (June 2008). p111-116.
 Draconids 2011 ephemerides

External links 
 Draconid Meteors Over Spain  (Astronomy Picture of the Day 2011 October 19)
 The 2012 Draconid Storm Potentially Sampled By NASA ER-2 Aircraft (item 12)

Meteor showers
October events